Boukha is a distilled beverage produced from figs. It originated in the Tunisian Jewish community, where most of it is still produced.

Etymology
Its name means 'alcohol vapor' in Judeo-Tunisian Arabic. It is obtained by simple distillation of Mediterranean figs. Its alcohol percentage ranges between 36 and 40 percent.

Overview
Boukha can be consumed straight at room temperature or cold, or serve as the basis for cocktails and for fruit salad.

History of boukha in Colonial Tunisia 
The production of Boukha was closely linked to the Jewish community in Tunisia and was seen as a threat by the French colonial authorities in Tunisia as something that would have a malicious and violent effect on Muslims in the region in comparison to French alcoholic products. In addition, the production of Boukha was creating an alcohol market that could not provide tax revenue for the French colonial authorities and thus was subject to alcohol laws that deliberately targeted indigenous Maghrebi drinks as they could be easily produced and consumed for less due to the lack of tax.

References

See also 

 Mahia

Distilled drinks
Sephardi Jewish cuisine
Jews and Judaism in Tunisia
Israeli cuisine
Tunisian cuisine
Tunisian distilled drinks